Soyuz TMA-11M was a 2013 flight to the International Space Station. It transported three members of the Expedition 38 crew to the International Space Station. TMA-11M is the 120th flight of a Soyuz spacecraft, with the first flight launching in 1967. The successful docking of the Soyuz TMA-11M spacecraft on November 7, 2013 marked the first time since October 2009 that nine people have resided on the space station without the presence of a Space Shuttle.

The rocket and spacecraft carried Olympic symbols on the fairing of the ship. During the mission, the Olympic torch was passed for the first time in open space. Russian cosmonauts Oleg Kotov and Sergey Ryazansky passed it in the Russian section of the International Space Station.

Crew

Backup crew

Cargo
TMA-11M carried the Olympic flame for the 2014 Winter Olympics into space for the first time. The torch returned to Earth 5 days later on board TMA-09M.

Gallery

References

Crewed Soyuz missions
Spacecraft launched in 2013
2013 in Russia
Spacecraft which reentered in 2014
Olympic flame
Spacecraft launched by Soyuz-FG rockets
Fully civilian crewed orbital spaceflights